Classic Rock 92FM was a radio station in Tauranga, New Zealand, on 92.5FM until it was replaced with Solid Gold in 1997.

References 

Radio stations in New Zealand
Mass media in Tauranga
Defunct radio stations in New Zealand